Barton's Club 93 is a hotel and casino located in Jackpot, Nevada. It is the largest privately held property in Jackpot and one of the main competitors of the Pinnacle Entertainment-owned Cactus Pete's and Horseshu Casino.

History
Barton's Club 93 was founded in 1957 as a motel next to Cactus Pete's. The operation was expanded in the 1970s to a property directly across the street.

The name "Club 93" is a reference to U.S. Route 93, which is the main road in Jackpot and where the property is located.

Casino
The casino features 300 + slot machines.

See also
List of casinos in Nevada

References

External links
 

1957 establishments in Nevada
Buildings and structures in Elko County, Nevada
Casinos in Nevada
Hotels in Nevada
Hotels established in 1967
Privately held companies based in Nevada
Tourist attractions in Elko County, Nevada